Liddy Hegewald (1884–1950) was a German film producer of the silent and early sound eras. She controlled her own production company Hegewald Film.

Selected filmography
 Raid (1921)
 Fratricide (1922)
 People in Need (1925)
 The Priest from Kirchfeld (1926)
 The Orlov (1927)
 Flirtation (1927)
 The Prince's Child (1927)
 German Women - German Faithfulness (1927)
 Fair Game (1928)
 Tales from the Vienna Woods (1928)
 The Happy Vagabonds (1929)
 Crucified Girl (1929)
 His Majesty's Lieutenant (1929)
 The Tsarevich (1929)
 Spring Awakening (1929)
The Citadel of Warsaw (1930)
 The Right to Love (1930)
 Oh Those Glorious Old Student Days (1930)
 A Girl from the Reeperbahn (1930)
 Pension Schöller (1930)
 Madame Bluebeard  (1931)
 When the Soldiers (1931)
 The Stranger (1931)

References

Bibliography
 Kester, Bernadette. Film Front Weimar: Representations of the First World War in German films of the Weimar Period (1919-1933). Amsterdam University Press, 2003. (At Google Books).

External links

1884 births
1950 deaths
German women film producers